Eastop is a surname. Notable people with the surname include:

 Dan Eastop, vocalist in the English band Seachange
 Geoffrey Eastop (1921–2014), English potter
 Pip Eastop (born 1958), English horn player
 Victor Frank Eastop (1924–2012), British entomologist